The Municipality of Petersham was a local government area of Sydney, New South Wales, Australia. The small municipality was proclaimed as a borough in 1871 and was centred on the suburbs of Lewisham, Petersham and Stanmore. It was bounded by Parramatta Road in the north, Cardigan and Liberty Streets in the east, Stanmore and New Canterbury Roads in the south, and Old Canterbury Road in the west. The municipality was divided into three wards: South Kingston, Annadale and Sydenham, all the names of early farms. The boundaries remained fairly stable, with only minor changes on the east and western sides. The borough became a municipality in 1906. In 1949 under the Local Government (Areas) Act 1948, Petersham council was merged with the larger neighbouring Marrickville Council which was located immediately to the south.

Mayors

References

Petersham
Petersham
Petersham
 
Inner West
Petersham, New South Wales